The Protes'tant Conference is a loose association of Lutheran churches and churchworkers in the United States. It was organized in 1927 by former members of the Wisconsin Evangelical Lutheran Synod (WELS) who had been suspended following an intrasynodical controversy. At its height, the Protes'tant Conference comprised twenty-two local congregations, but it had declined to just six by the early 2000s.

It is a conservative, confessional Lutheran Christian group with German immigrant roots. It published the periodical Faith-Life as a conference, and formerly operated the Protes'tant Conference website. It does not consider itself as a denomination or a church body, but a loose association of churchworkers and independent congregations.

Orthography
The organization's name includes a single typewriter quotation mark after the second syllable of the word “Protestant,” indicating an accent thereon.

History  
The Protes'tant Conference arose out of a controversy in the WELS over a document known as the Beitz Paper (written by then Wisconsin Synod pastor W. F. Beitz) in 1926–1927. In his paper, Pastor Beitz discussed the doctrinal philosophy then prevalent in the synod. Debate arose over the theological nature of the document and about 40 supporters of Pastor Beitz were subsequently suspended from the Wisconsin Synod as a result. These pastors, teachers, and some congregations organized into the non-centralized Protes'tant Conference. It has undergone three schisms, in 1930, 1952, and 1964.

Internally, the Protes'tant Conference sometimes referred to itself as The Protes'tant Conference of the Wisconsin Synod. The name "Protes'tant" was adopted in 1929, on the 400th anniversary of the Second Diet of Speyer. That diet of the Holy Roman Empire had outlawed Lutheranism and resulted in the reformers adopting the name "Protestant" . The name "Protes'tant" was chosen to signify their protest against "synodicalism" on the part of both the Wisconsin and Missouri Synods. While the Missouri Synod did not expel the Protes'tants, it synodically ratified the expulsions in 1927.

Core beliefs
The Protes'tant Conference taught that the Bible is the only authoritative and error-free source for doctrine. It subscribed to the Lutheran Confessions (the Book of Concord) not in-so-far-as but because it is an accurate presentation of what Scripture teaches. It taught that Jesus is the center of Scripture and the only way to eternal salvation, and that the Holy Spirit uses the gospel alone in Word and Sacraments (Baptism and Holy Communion) to bring people to faith in Jesus as Savior and keep them in that faith, strengthening them in their daily life of sanctification.

Notes

External links
 Official website
 The Beitz Paper
 Prof. Fredrich's analysis of the controversy
 J.P. Koehler's Rebuttal & Defense

Lutheranism in Wisconsin
Lutheran denominations in North America
Lutheranism in California
Lutheranism in Michigan
Wisconsin Evangelical Lutheran Synod